Hans Olsson may refer to:

 Hans Olsson (politician) (born 1951), Swedish politician of the Social Democratic Party
 Hans Olsson (alpine skier) (born 1984), Swedish alpine skier
 Hans Olsson (canoeist) (born 1964), Swedish sprint canoer
  (1929-2007), Swedish handballer, two times world champion.

See also
 Hans Olson (born 1952), American musician and songwriter
 Hans H. Olson (1847–1912), politician
 Hans Olsen (disambiguation)
 Olsson (surname)